Signal bleed is a type of filter, usually for cable television, that does not block a targeted channel as designed.  Such filters came to public awareness as more channels with adult material began to be available on cable television services and, occasionally, children were able to view faint or partial images of adult material on channels that were supposed to be completely blocked.

Signal bleed was discussed in the 2000 U.S. Supreme Court case United States v. Playboy Entertainment Group.

External links
 Channel-surfing Supreme Court takes on 'signal-bleed' dispute
 Signal Bleed: How Big a Problem?
 How to Keep Pornographic 'Signal Bleed' out of Your Home

Cable television technology